The 1916 Wyoming Cowboys football team was an American football team that represented the University of Wyoming as a member of the Rocky Mountain Conference (RMC) during the 1916 college football season. In their second season under head coach John Corbett, the Cowboys compiled a 1–4 record with all games against conference opponents, place sixth in the RMC, and were outscored by a total of 115 to 50. L. E. Mau was the team captain.

Schedule

References

Wyoming
Wyoming Cowboys football seasons
Wyoming Cowboys football